Minuscule 43 (in the Gregory-Aland numbering), α 270 and ε 170 (Von Soden), is a Greek minuscule manuscript of the New Testament, on parchment leaves (20.5 by 15 cm). Palaeographically it has been assigned to the 11th century. Gregory suggested the 12th century. It has full marginalia.

Description 

It was split in two volumes. The first volume has Gospels on 199 leaves with size . The second volume containing Acts and Epistles on 189 leaves with size 21.2 by 15.2 cm. The codex contains entire of the New Testament, except last its book - Apocalypse. It has also some lacunae.

The text of the Gospels has also another division according to the smaller Ammonian Sections (in Mark 234 sections, the last numbered section in 16:9), with references to the Eusebian Canons.

Text 

The Greek text of the codex is a representative of the Byzantine text-type with some alien readings. Hermann von Soden classified it to the textual family Kx. Aland did not place it in any of his Categories.
According to the Claremont Profile Method it represents the textual family Kx.

In 1 John 5:6 it has textual variant δι' ὕδατος καὶ πνεύματος (through water and spirit) together with the manuscripts 241, 463, 945, 1241, 1831, 1877*, 1891.

History 

The manuscript was dated by Gregory to the 12th century (with some hesitation). Currently it has been assigned by the INTF to the 11th century.

Possibly it was written in Ephesus. It was given by P. de Berzi in 1661 to the Oratory of San Maglorian. It was examined and described by Amelotte, Simon, Scholz. and Paulin Martin, C. R. Gregory saw the manuscript in 1884.

It was added to the list of the New Testament manuscripts by Wettstein.

It is currently housed in at the Bibliothèque de l'Arsenal (8409. 8410), one of the branches of the Bibliothèque nationale de France, at Paris.

See also 
 List of New Testament minuscules
 Biblical manuscript
 Textual criticism

Notes

References

Further reading

External links 
 R. Waltz, Minuscule 43 At the Encyclopedia of Textual Criticism (2007)

Greek New Testament minuscules
11th-century biblical manuscripts
Bibliothèque nationale de France collections